Oswaldo Frossasco (25 June 1952 – 2 April 2022) was an Argentine cyclist. He competed in the individual road race and team time trial events at the 1976 Summer Olympics.

References

External links
 

1952 births
2022 deaths
Argentine male cyclists
Olympic cyclists of Argentina
Cyclists at the 1976 Summer Olympics
Sportspeople from Córdoba Province, Argentina
20th-century Argentine people